Brierley is a village and former civil parish in the Metropolitan Borough of Barnsley in South Yorkshire, England. The civil parish was abolished in 2016.

Its late nineteenth century founded civil parish contained the pit village of Grimethorpe, and at the 2001 census had a population of 5,973, increasing to 7,267 in the 2011 Census.

History
Brierley was an early Saxon settlement. The fort at Brierley Gap, mistakenly called Saxon, is from a much earlier period, probably the Iron Age. The village grew first around the hilltop on the Barnsley to Pontefract road where a small hollow and the sites of several wells provided a good building area.

Along Ket Hill Lane, coal seams come to the surface and form part of the soil so coal must have been known to these early farmers. Sandstone and coal in alternate layers are the underlying rocks of the area. In the Domesday Book, Brierley is referred to as 'Brerelia' in the wapentake of Staincross. The actual Domesday Book spelling is 'Breselia' but all ensuing documents use 'Brerelia' as the correct form.

Later, this name became 'Brereley', then Brearley from which we get one of our modern pronunciations. It was first spelt as 'Brierley' in some documents relating to the leasing of Brierley Manor by descendants of the Harryngton family, from Queen Elizabeth I in 1572.

This spelling of the name was not commonly used until it appeared in a Manor Court Roll for 1665. The early field boundaries can be recognised on the Ordnance Survey Map by the irregular way in which they ring the village and by the winding outline of their hedges due to the ploughing methods of the time.

On a well-hidden site between Brierley and Grimethorpe, stood the fortified Manor of Hall Steads (the name means 'hall site'), which belonged to the early Brereley estate.

The building was mainly of local sandstone and many of the stones remain in the soil among which fragments of 14th and 15th century pottery have been found. St Paul's Church in Brierley was built in 1869 as a daughter church to the Parish of St Peter, Felkirk, it was deemed insufficient for the expanding population of the south of the area which formed Grimethorpe which equally became an ecclesiastical parish albeit later, in 1901, and the first vicar, set about raising funds to build its respective church.

Major donations were received from Mr F.J. Savile-Foljambe who donated the lands for the church and the vicarage and the Carlton Main Colliery, and the church was completed in 1904. St. Paul's Church in Brierley was built in 1869 for George Savile Foljambe, Lord of the Manor of Brierley, to the designs of John Wade in the Gothic Revival style.

Foljambe provided half the cost of the church, and the rest was donated by other local principal people, the land for the church and former Brierley church school was given by Rev John Hoyland, vicar of Felkirk. The first curate was Rev Godfrey Pigott Cordeux.

See also
Listed buildings in Brierley and Grimethorpe

References

External links

Brierly village web site

 
Towns in South Yorkshire
Unparished areas in South Yorkshire
Former civil parishes in South Yorkshire
Geography of the Metropolitan Borough of Barnsley